Bonestan or Banestan or Benestan may refer to:
 Bonestan, Jebalbarez, Jiroft County, Kerman Province
 Banestan, Boyer-Ahmad, Kohgiluyeh and Boyer-Ahmad Province
 Banestan, Dana, Kohgiluyeh and Boyer-Ahmad Province
 Banestan, Behabad, Yazd Province
 Bonestan, Taft, Yazd Province
 Banestan Rural District, in Yazd Province